José Ángel Uribarrena Díez (born 8 January 1969), sometimes known as Jon Uribarrena, is a Spanish former professional footballer who played as a forward.

He spent the majority of his career with Athletic Bilbao, and amassed 92 La Liga appearances and five goals during his time with Athletic, two loan spells at Logroñés, and a season playing for Celta Vigo.

Career

Uribarrena was born in Portugalete, close to Bilbao in the province of Biscay, in the autonomous community of the Basque Country, and began his career in the youth teams of Athletic Bilbao. He made his debut for their B team, Bilbao Athletic, aged just 17, in a home Segunda División match against Recreativo de Huelva on 4 January 1987.

He began to take a major role with the B team during the following season, in which they were relegated. In 1988–89, however, he was the team's top scorer as they won their Segunda División B group to earn promotion back to the second tier at the first attempt. First team coach Howard Kendall gave him his La Liga debut on 29 October 1989, in a 3–0 win over Málaga, and during that season and 1990–91 he combined occasional first team appearances with regular B team starts.

Uribarrena spent the 1991–92 season on loan at Logroñés, where he scored his first top flight goal in a 2–2 home draw with Barcelona at Estadio Las Gaunas. After just one Copa del Rey appearance for Athletic at the start of the following season, he returned for a second loan spell at Logroñés in November 1992. He played 45 first division matches across his two spells in Logroño.

1993–94 was Uribarrena's best season for Athletic, as he made 19 appearances and scored his only goal for the first team, in a 1–1 home draw with Sevilla at San Mamés on 24 April. He finally left Bilbao for good on 29 August 1994, signing for Celta Vigo and bringing an end to eight years at San Mamés which saw him make a total of 31 first team appearances.

The summer of 1994 was one of great upheval for Celta, with key players including Santiago Cañizares, Stjepan Andrijašević, Jorge Otero and Vicente Engonga departing. They were replaced by an influx of lesser-known players, such as José Manuel Tárraga, Ángel Merino, Hermes Desio and Uribarrena, who signed for two years with an option of a third, and earned Athletic a fee of 30 million pesetas. That summer also saw coach Txetxu Rojo, who had coached Uribarrena at Bilbao Athletic, depart for Osasuna, and be replaced by Carlos Aimar, who had done likewise at Logroñés. Uribarrena made his debut for Los Celestes on 4 September in an away game against Albacete Balompié at Estadio Carlos Belmonte, and marked the occasion with a goal, nodding home a free kick after 42 minutes to give his side the lead. The match ended 1–1.

Celta finished the season in mid-table, and although Uribarrena played 25 matches, he failed to add to his goal tally. He had failed to win over either Celta's coaching staff or their fans, and he was transfer listed that summer, despite having a year left on his contract. He left the club in July 1995, signing for Almería in the Segunda División. He made 22 appearances during his first season, failing to score, but didn't play at all in 1996–97. In 1997 he signed for Aurrerá de Vitoria in the third tier, where he spent the next three seasons. He then moved to Portugal, spending the 2000–01 season with GD Chaves in the Segunda Liga before retiring at the age of 32.

Honours
Bilbao Athletic
Segunda División B: 1988–89

Career statistics

References

External links

JON URIBARRENA at yojugueenelcelta.com 

1969 births
Living people
People from Portugalete
Footballers from the Basque Country (autonomous community)
Spanish footballers
Association football forwards
La Liga players
Segunda División players
Segunda División B players
Bilbao Athletic footballers
Athletic Bilbao footballers
CD Logroñés footballers
RC Celta de Vigo players
UD Almería players
Spanish expatriate footballers
Expatriate footballers in Portugal
Spanish expatriate sportspeople in Portugal
Liga Portugal 2 players
G.D. Chaves players
CD Aurrerá de Vitoria footballers